Fourth National Bank may refer to:
 Fourth National Bank of Atlanta - whose headquarters now houses the Andrew Young School of Policy Studies
 Fourth National Bank of Chicago
 Fourth Financial Corporation of Wichita, Kansas
 Fourth National Bank of New York